Wilshire Center is a neighborhood in the Wilshire region of Los Angeles, California.

Geography

The name "Wilshire Center" is a relatively modern moniker that refers to much of the eastern portion of the Wilshire Community Plan area (CPA), generally from Virgil Avenue and Hoover Street on the east to Wilton Place and Crenshaw Boulevard on the west. It borders Hollywood to the north at Melrose Avenue, and Koreatown and part of Harvard Heights to the south. The area was historically known as part of the Wilshire District. As the Wilshire area expanded westward, neighborhood names emerged to distinguish parts of the district from each other.

Wilshire Center includes some of the Wilshire CPA's oldest streetcar suburbs dating to the early 20th century. Historic Preservation Overlay Zones within Wilshire Center include Wilshire Park and Country Club Park.

Within the neighborhood, the Wilshire Center Regional Commercial Center, as defined in the city's general plan, is generally bounded by 3rd Street on the north, 8th Street on the south, Hoover Street on the east, and Wilton Place on the west. Google Maps uses the general boundaries of the Regional Commercial Center for the neighborhood. Services provided by the business improvement district are limited to the commercial area between Wilton Place, Hoover Street, Third Street and Eighth Street.

Transportation
Wilshire Center is served by city buses, including several Metro Rapid lines, and three subway stations along Wilshire Boulevard. The Metro D Line, which begins at Union Station in Downtown Los Angeles, has stations at Vermont Ave., Normandie Ave., and Western Ave., at which it currently terminates. An extension of the D Line subway under Wilshire Boulevard to Westwood is scheduled for completion in 2028. The Vermont station is also served by the Metro B Line, which continues north through Hollywood to North Hollywood.

History
Wilshire Boulevard is named for Henry Gaylord Wilshire—a  millionaire who in 1895 began developing a  parcel stretching westward from Westlake Park (MacArthur Park) for an elite residential subdivision. A socialist, Wilshire donated to the city a strip of land for a boulevard on the conditions that it would be named for him and ban public transit, railroad lines, and commercial or industrial trucking and freight trains.

A Los Angeles Times overview of the area referred to "the corridor's former glory as a haven for blue-chip corporations and fine shopping."

In the early 1900s, steam-driven motorcars started sharing Wilshire Boulevard with horse-drawn carriages. At the turn of the century, Germain Pellissier raised sheep and barley between Normandie and Western Avenues. Reuben Schmidt purchased land east of Normandie for his dairy farm.

In the mid-1990s, it had a reputation for "crime and grime," and many businesses had left the area, but by 2001 it had recovered. The Los Angeles Times noted that:
"Another sign of the district's popularity emerged this summer with the opening of a plush, $35-million spa, mall and golf complex called Aroma Wilshire Center just east of Western Avenue that caters to the city's affluent Korean population, many of them entrepreneurs who own businesses in the area."

Apartment buildings
Distinguished high-rise apartment buildings and hotels were erected along Wilshire Boulevard. In approximately 1929, the Academy Awards ceremony was moved from the Hollywood Roosevelt Hotel to the Ambassador Hotel. It closed in 1989 and, despite efforts of historic preservationists, has been demolished. The site is owned by the Los Angeles Unified School District, which in 2010 opened the Robert F. Kennedy Community Schools and a small park on the site. It is the most expensive public school in the United States.

The area nearby became the site of elegant New York-style apartment buildings such as the Asbury, the Langham, the Fox Normandie, the Picadilly, the Talmadge (after Norma Talmadge), the Gaylord, and the Windsor. Many film stars lived in these buildings.

As of 2021, a building boom fueled by density bonuses and the City of Los Angeles's Transit-Oriented Community incentives has increased the supply of apartments and condominiums in the area, and older office buildings have been converted into apartments and condos. Large apartment buildings have been constructed at the Metro stops at Wilshire/Western and Wilshire/Vermont.

Commercial
Gloria Swanson's husband, Herbert Somborn, opened the Brown Derby Restaurant, a hat-shaped building at Wilshire and Alexandria, in 1926. The hat now sits on top of a restaurant in a mini-mall.

In 1929, the elegant Art-Deco Bullocks Wilshire was built at Wilshire and Westmoreland as the city's first branch department store in the suburbs. It closed in 1993 and now houses the library of Southwestern Law School.

A section of Germain Pellessier's sheep farm became the site of the Pellessier Building and Wiltern Theatre, which began construction at the corner of Wilshire and Western in 1929. The theater, operated by Warner Brothers, opened in 1931.

In 1929, the Chapman Market drew motorcars to the world's first drive-through grocery store at Sixth St and Alexandria. 

The San Francisco-based I. Magnin opened a store in 1939 at Wilshire and New Hampshire.

In 2001, David Y. Lee was the largest landlord in the district, owning 20 buildings comprising about 7 million square feet of space in Mid-Wilshire and three buildings in nearby Park Mile.

Office buildings
In 1952, on the driving range on the south side of Wilshire between Mariposa and Normandie, the first three 12-story Tishman Plaza buildings were built in 1952 (they're now known as Central Plaza), designed by Claude Beelman.

Insurance companies began locating their West Coast headquarters in Wilshire Center because of tax incentives provided by the State. Some 22 high-rise office buildings were erected on Wilshire Boulevard from 1966 to 1976 to provide office space for such companies as Getty Oil Co., Ahmanson Financial Co., Beneficial Standard Life Insurance, Wausau, and Equitable Life Insurance. The Chapman Park Hotel, built in 1936, was torn down to make way for the 34-story Equitable Plaza office building erected in 1969. By 1970, firms such as CNA, Pacific Indemnity, and Pierce National Life were starting construction of their own high-rise buildings. Southwestern University School of Law moved from its downtown location of 50 years to a four-story campus just south of Wilshire Boulevard on Westmoreland in 1973.

In the 1970s and 1980s, commerce moved to the city's less congested Westside as well as the San Fernando Valley, and businesses and affluent residents eventually followed. I. Magnin closed, while Bullocks Wilshire held out until 1993. Rental rates in office buildings plummeted from an average of $1.65/sq ft to a dollar between 1991 and 1996; property values dropped from a high of $120/sq ft to $30 or $40 per foot in 1998.

Wilshire Center lost most of its remaining original glitter following the 1992 Los Angeles riots and the 1994 Northridge earthquake.

Subsequently, the Wilshire Center Streetscape Project  used federal funds to rejuvenate Wilshire Boulevard. It was one of the most ambitious and significant urban rehabilitation projects found anywhere in America and in 1999 was awarded the Lady Bird Johnson Award from The National Arbor Day Foundation.

Religious buildings
Wilshire Christian Church was the first church on Wilshire Boulevard in 1911. The church property at Wilshire and Normandie was donated by the Chapman Brothers, owners of Chapman Market, whose historic building remains nearby on Sixth Street.

Some of the buildings are:

Korean Philadelphia Presbyterian Church, on New Hampshire Avenue, formerly the Sinai Congregation

The Los Angeles Korean Methodist Church, at 4th and Normandie, formerly a Christian Science congregation
Immanuel Presbyterian Church (Wilshire & Berendo)
First Congregational Church of Los Angeles (6th & Commonwealth)
St. James Episcopal Church (Wilshire & St Andrews)
First Baptist Church of Los Angeles (8th & Westmoreland)
St Basil's Catholic Church, a modern building, on Wilshire
Founder's Church of Religious Science, on 6th Street
Wilshire Boulevard Temple (Reform Jewish)
The Islamic Center of Southern California, a modern building, on Vermont

Community organizations

The Wilshire Center/Koreatown Neighborhood Council (WCKNC)

Education and services
Wilshire Center is zoned to the Los Angeles Unified School District. All areas are zoned to Los Angeles High School.

Schools include:
Los Angeles Elementary School
Wilton Place Elementary School 
Berendo Middle School
Burroughs Middle School

Parks and recreation

The Pio Pico–Koreatown branch of the Los Angeles Public Library is located at 7th and Oxford Streets.

The Anderson-Munger branch of the YMCA of Metropolitan Los Angeles is at 3rd and Oxford Streets.

There are no city parks or community gardens in Wilshire Center, and only small parks in the surrounding communities. This is one of the most 'park-poor' areas of the city.

See also

 Harold A. Henry, Los Angeles City Council president active in improving Wilshire Center
 List of Los Angeles Historic-Cultural Monuments in the Wilshire and Westlake areas

Further reading
“Wilshire Boulevard Milestones," by Jane Gilman, publisher of Larchmont Chronicle.
The Curating the City Tour Book by the Los Angeles Conservancy
“Streetscape: the Plan that Saved a Community” by David Wallace.

Notes

References

External links

Tour of Wilshire Boulevard: Exploring Wilshire Boulevard's history and historical buildings.
Wilshire Angels Walk LA: A walking tour of Wilshire Center's history and historical buildings by way of guidebook and map (download link).
 Wilshire Boulevard Milestones: The Wilshire Center's history, by Larchmont Chronicle publisher by Jane Gilman.

Mid-Wilshire, Los Angeles
Neighborhoods in Los Angeles
Central Los Angeles
Business improvement districts in the United States
1895 establishments in California
Populated places established in 1895